Jane Hamilton (November 7, 1915 – February 9, 2004) was an American film actress. She appeared in over 20 films between 1933 and 1949.

Modern viewers will recognize Hamilton in her appearances in several early Three Stooges films such as Three Missing Links and Start Cheering.

Hamilton died in Malibu, California in 2004.

References

External links

1915 births
2004 deaths
American film actresses
20th-century American actresses
Actresses from Baltimore
21st-century American women